Laprak is situated in the northern part of Gorkha, Nepal village development committee in Gorkha District in the Gandaki Zone of northern-central Nepal. Laprak is densely inhabited by Gurungs and few number of Sunars. At the time of the 1991 Nepal census it had a population of 2,165 and had 462 houses in the village.

There are more than 600 houses in one village. Laprak village can be reached by direct bus transportation from Gorkha, Kathmandu, Pokhara, Chitwan except in rainy season.

References

Populated places in Gorkha District